Steven Jacobsz Vennekool (1660–1719) was an 18th-century architect from the Northern Netherlands.  He was born and died in  Amsterdam.

He was an assistant to Jacob van Campen, along with Pieter Post, Arent van 's Gravesande, Bartholomeus Drijflhout, Willem de Keyser, and Daniël Stalpaert and learned from him the neo-classical styles made popular by Palladio and Vincenzo Scamozzi. He was a member of the chamber of rhetoric called the Egelantier. His sister married the painter Johannes Glauber.
According to the RKD he was buried in Amsterdam on 7 March 1719.

References

1660 births
1719 deaths
Architects from Amsterdam
18th-century Dutch architects